Gospel Music Heritage Month was spearheaded and pioneered by Alvin V. Williams in 2007. Gospel Music Heritage Month in the United States was established in June 2008, by dual legislation passed by the House of Representatives and the Senate designated September as Gospel Music Heritage Month.

Mission

To educate and celebrate the art form and rich heritage of all genres of gospel music through word and song.

Creation of Gospel Music Heritage Month

The Gospel Music Heritage initiative was conceived by Charles Humbard CEO of UPtv and entertainment executive Alvin V. Williams, former employee of UPtv.  Charles Humbard and Alvin V. Williams were discussing how to create a day that would recognize the rich heritage of Gospel music with original programming surrounding it that could be attractive to advertisers. Williams spearheaded this initiative by researching the rich legacy of Gospel music and building a team of supporters.  This research covered Field Hollers, Corn Ditties, Negro Spirituals, Quartet Music, Gospel Music, Southern Gospel, Contemporary Gospel, Country Music, Folk, and Christian Music.

Williams also began to reach out to other members of the community to help push this initiative along: John Stylls President of the Gospel Music Association of America (GMA), Neil R. Portnow, President of National Academy of Recording Arts and Sciences (NARAS). He got Congresswoman Shelia Jackson Lee (Democrat, Houston, TX) to support it. After a conference call with all parties, the collective suggested that Gospel Music Heritage initiative should be recognized during an entire month and not just a day and it became Gospel Music Heritage Month.  Lee got Senator Blanche Lincoln (Democrat, Arkansas) to support the initiative in the US Senate.

Alvin V. Williams research on the rich legacy of Gospel Music was the foundation and the essence Resolution that Congresswoman Shelia Jackson Lee took and presented to the House and Senate now known as H. Res. 900  and in the Senate  (S. Res. 595).

In 2008, Congresswoman Jackson Lee and Senator Lincoln led the passing of a resolution in both chambers declaring September as Gospel Music Heritage Month. In each year since its establishment, local and global celebrations have been held during this month to educate and entertain diverse audiences with the rich history and legacy of gospel.

References

Gospel music